George Washington Carver School is a public school in Coral Gables, Florida. Now a middle school, it was once a K-12, segregated, black school. It is part of the Miami-Dade County Public Schools district.

History
The school opened in 1899 as a black school, for black students residing in Dade County, although it traces its beginning to an earlier private school for black children, informally known as "The Little Schoolhouse," which opened in 1899 as the private Dade Training School. In 1943, when he died, the school was renamed for George Washington Carver. Carver was desegregated by a court order in 1966-1967. For athletics, the school participated in the Florida Interscholastic Athletic Association

After integration, the school became a junior high school, and later a middle school.

Notable alumni
 Zach Banks - racing driver.
 Craig Curry - football player, businessman attended Carver until it was closed for integration
 Edwin T. Pratt, civil rights activist
 Winston Scott - astronaut

Notable employees
 Bertha Vazquez - science teacher and director of the Teacher Institute for Evolutionary Science

See also 

 Miami-Dade County Public Schools

References

External links
 

Buildings and structures in Coral Gables, Florida
Defunct schools in Florida
Miami-Dade County Public Schools high schools
Miami-Dade County Public Schools schools
Elementary schools in Miami-Dade County, Florida
Middle schools in Miami-Dade County, Florida
K-12 schools in Florida
Historically segregated African-American schools in Florida
Educational institutions established in 1899
1899 establishments in Florida
Historically black schools